Cumali may refer to:

 Cumalı, Bilecik, Turkey
 Cumalı, Bozkurt, Turkey
 Cumalı, Çine, Turkey
 Cumalı, Gelibolu, Turkey
 Cumalı, İhsaniye, Turkey
 Cumali, Ortaköy, Turkey
 Cumalı, Serik, Turkey

People
Cumali (Turkish name), list of people with the name